The Great Baikal Trail or GBT (Russian:  (Bolshaya Baikalskaya Tropa or BBT)) is a Russian non-profit environmental organization promoting the development of ecotourism, voluntary work, and ecological education.  Based in Irkutsk, Russia, GBT is working to build hiking trails around Lake Baikal. Between 2003 and 2012, GBT has run over 180 international projects, building or improving trails at various points throughout the Siberian regions of Irkutsk and Buryatia with the help of more than 4,500 volunteers from around Russia and the world.

Mission
The mission of the Great Baikal Trail is to promote the sustainable development of ecotourism in the Lake Baikal region as an alternative to industrialism. Their mission is for an overall goal of the preservation and protection of the environment, through an increased awareness of environmental issues.

History
Irkutsk traveler and writer Valentin Bryanskii promoted the idea of a circular trail around Baikal beginning in the 1970s.

Between 2002-2003, the U.S. Forest Service funded a series of exchanges between professionals, trail builders, and representatives from the protected regions around Lake Baikal. At the same time, two organizations – the Federation of Sports Tourism and Mountaineering of the Republic of Buryatia and Earth Island Institute's Baikal Watch in San Francisco, United States – were awarded a joint grant from the Foundation for Russian American Economic Cooperation for an exchange program to share experience in trail construction. In the fall of 2002, specialists from the Tahoe Rim Trail Association, the U.S. Forest Service, and EarthCorps came to Lake Baikal. They met representatives of the protected areas, and discussed trail building and planning techniques used in the United States.

In February 2004, three young people were sent to train at the organization EarthCorps, in Seattle, United States, to gain skills on trail construction and volunteer management. They returned just in time for the 2004 season with GBT. With them came two qualified experts from EarthCorp], who spent three months helping with work on 15 projects. 2004 was a significant year, as Rotary International "adopted" 62 miles of trail, and Baikal Plan in Germany joined up with GBT, sending 100 volunteers to help with trail construction. Also in 2004, GBT was incorporated as a non-profit organization, allowing it to apply for grants. This is how it became the interregional public organization "The Great Baikal Trail."

Projects

Summer projects
The summer is the most active season for GBT. They run several two-week trail-building projects around Lake Baikal.

Winter projects
In winter there is no trail-building, but other projects take place. Participants create signs, trail descriptions, booklets and other promotion materials for the trails and protected areas around Lake Baikal.

Language projects
Eco-English is typically a ten-day full English language immersion program aimed towards Russian participants with at least an intermediate English level, to learn and practice English. During the program, there are English classes with environmental focus, interactive activities, and trail building.

Educational projects
Besides the standard trail building projects, GBT also conducts educational projects, often in partnership with other groups. These projects vary depending on the focus and desire of each individual organizational partner.

Leadership courses
The Great Baikal Trail organizes annual leadership courses for young, energetic, and inquisitive individuals who love travelling, intercultural communication, and Lake Baikal.

Courses for crew leaders

A crew leader is a GBT specialist who has been trained in trail construction and maintenance, and who has shown an ability to manage international teams in an outdoor setting.

GBT Youth Club
In 2003, the GBT Youth Club was formed for the coordination of activities within the organization.

Members often have the opportunity to participate in the international programs of organizations such as EarthCorps, based in Seattle.

Trails

Listvyanka to Bolshie Koty

The Listvyanka — Bolshie Koty section of the Great Baikal Trail is located within Pribaikalsky National Park.

In the jungles of Khamar-Daban
This section of trail is in the Khamar-Daban mountain range and is located within the Baikalsky Nature Reserve.

External links

Official website of the Great Baikal Trail

Hiking trails in Siberia
Russian tourist routes
Lake Baikal